Daniel Edwards is an American contemporary artist.

Daniel, Dan, or Danny Edwards may also refer to:
 Daniel R. Edwards (1897–1967), United States Army Medal of Honor recipient
 Dan Edwards (1926–2001), American football player
 Dan Thomas Edwards (living), American bishop
 Danny Edwards (born 1951), American professional golfer